South Sulawesi is a province in the southern peninsula of Sulawesi. The Selayar Islands archipelago to the south of Sulawesi is also part of the province. The capital is Makassar. The province is bordered by Central Sulawesi and West Sulawesi to the north, the Gulf of Bone and Southeast Sulawesi to the east, Makassar Strait to the west, and Flores Sea to the south.

The 2010 census estimated the population as 8,032,551 which makes South Sulawesi the most populous province on the island (46% of the population of Sulawesi is in South Sulawesi), and the sixth most populous province in Indonesia. At the 2020 Census this had risen to 9,073,509, and the official estimate as at mid 2021 was 9,139,531. The main ethnic groups in South Sulawesi are the Buginese, Makassarese, Toraja, and Mandar. The economy of the province is based on agriculture, fishing, and mining of gold, magnesium, iron and other metals. The pinisi, a traditional Indonesian two-masted sailing ship, is still used widely by the Buginese and Makassarese, mostly for inter-insular transportation, cargo, and fishing purposes within the Indonesian archipelago.

During the golden era of the spice trade, from the 15th to 19th centuries, South Sulawesi served as the gateway to the Maluku Islands. There were a number of small kingdoms, including two prominent ones, the Kingdom of Gowa near Makassar and the Bugis kingdom located in Bone. The Dutch East India Company (VOC) began operating in the region in the 17th century. VOC later allied with the Bugis prince, Arung Palakka, and they defeated the kingdom of Gowa. The king of Gowa, Sultan Hasanuddin was forced to sign a treaty which greatly reduced the power of Bungaya Gowa.

History

Sulawesi was first inhabited by humans around 30,000 years ago. The archaeological remains of the earliest inhabitants were discovered in caves near limestone hills around Maros, about 30 km northeast of Makassar. Pebble and flake stone tools have been collected from the river terraces in the valley of Walanae, among Soppeng and Sengkang, including the bones from giant pig and elephant species that are now extinct.

Increase in commerce due to the rise of external demand for South Sulawesi rice encouraged major agricultural expansion and political centralization in the early 14th century. Swidden agriculture was increasingly replaced with intensive wet rice cultivation, leading to a rise in population density. New settlements were founded in the interior part of the peninsula as pristine forests were cleared. These changes accompanied the rise of new interior agricultural polities, such as the Bugis chiefdoms of Boné and Wajoq, as well as the Makassar polity of Gowa.

By the early 16th century, Boné had assumed a paramount position in the eastern part of the peninsula, while the Makassar twin kingdoms of Gowa and Talloq started to expand their influence throughout the western part. Their competition for hegemony over South Sulawesi caused Gowa-Talloq and Boné to clash in the 1560s.

In 1582, Boné, Soppéng, and Wajoq signed a mutual defense pact known as the Treaty of Timurung. The alliance, also referred to as the Tellumpocco ("Three Powers", lit. "Three Peaks"), sought to stop Gowa's expansionism and to reclaim the autonomy of the Bugis polities under Gowa's vassalage. Gowa's campaigns against the alliance in 1582, 1585, and 1588 were all successfully repulsed, with another one in 1590 abandoned following the death of Gowa's ruler. By the early 17th century, however, Gowa and Talloq had become the dominant powers in South Sulawesi as they supported international commerce and embracing Islam. Gowa waged successful campaigns against the Bugis kingdoms, defeating Soppéng in 1609, Wajoq in 1610, and Boné in 1611.

The Dutch East India Company (VOC) began operating in the region in the 17th century and saw the Kingdom of Gowa as an obstacle for its desire to control of the spice trade in this area. VOC later allied with the Bugis prince, Arung Palakka, who was living in exile after the fall of the Bugis. After a year-long battle, they defeated the kingdom of Gowa. And the king of Gowa, Sultan Hasanuddin was forced to sign a treaty greatly reducing the power of Bungaya Gowa. Furthermore, Palakka became ruler in South Sulawesi.

A Bugis queen later emerged to lead the resistance against the Dutch, who were busy dealing with the Napoleonic Wars in Europe, but after the end of the Napoleonic Wars, the Dutch returned to South Sulawesi and eradicated the queen's rebellion. But resistance of the Bugis people against colonial rule continued until 1905. In 1905, the Dutch also managed to conquer Tana Toraja.

Before the proclamation of the Republic of Indonesia, South Sulawesi consisted of a number of independent kingdoms' territory and was inhabited by four ethnic groups namely the Bugis, Makassar, Mandar, and Toraja.

On June 16, 2022, a tornado struck in the province, damaging 63 homes. One man died of a stress-induced medical issue during the tornado, but was not a direct tornado-related fatality.

Geography
South Sulawesi is located at 4°20'S 120°15'E and covers an area of 46,717.48 square kilometres. The province is bordered by Central Sulawesi and West Sulawesi to the north, the Gulf of Bone and Southeast Sulawesi to the east, Makassar Strait to the west, and Flores Sea to the south.

Administrative divisions 

Five years after independence, the government issued Law No. 21 of 1950, which became the basis of the legal establishment of what was then the Sulawesi province. Ten years later, the government passed Law No. 47 of 1960 which endorsed the formation of the South/Southeast Sulawesi province. Four years after that, with Act No. 13 of 1964, the provinces of South Sulawesi and Southeast Sulawesi were separated. Forty years later, the South Sulawesi government was split into two, with the regencies of Majene, Mamasa, Mamuju, Pasangkayu, and Polewali Mandar being separated off into a new West Sulawesi province on 5 October 2004 under Act No. 26 of 2004.

The remaining South Sulawesi Province is divided into 21 regencies and three independent cities.

Demographics

Ethnic groups

South Sulawesi has a diverse range of ethnic groups. The main three are:
 The Buginese (Suku Bugis) are the largest ethnic group in South Sulawesi, comprising over 3½ million people. These people inhabit the middle of the southern peninsula of South Sulawesi. Many of these people have migrated to the outer islands around Sulawesi, even as far as Malaysia.
 The Makassarese (Suku Makassar) are the second largest ethnic group in South Sulawesi. Their language is Makassar. Makassar people inhabit the southern part of the southern peninsula of South Sulawesi including the Jeneponto, Takalar, Bulukumba, Bantaeng, Gowa and Maros Regencies, Pangkajene and Islands, and Makassar city. The total population is over 2 million people.
 The Torajan (Suku Toraja) are the indigenous ethnic group which inhabits the mountainous region of South Sulawesi. Their population is approximately 750,000, 70% of which still live in the regencies of Tana Toraja ("Land of Toraja") and North Toraja.

Language
There are various languages and dialects spoken in South Sulawesi. The majority of them belong to the Malayo-Polynesian branch of Austronesian languages. Below is the list of major languages spoken in the province.

 Makassarese is spoken in the southwestern part of the province, including the city of Makassar. It has a total of 2.1 million speakers.
 Buginese is spoken in an area stretching from Pinrang in the northwest to Bulukumba in the southeast. This language is the predominant language used by many communities in South Sulawesi. It is natively spoken by around 5 million people plus 500,000 second language speakers, making it one of the most widely spoken language in both South Sulawesi and the island of Sulawesi.
 The Tae' language is mostly spoken in Tana Luwu. It had approximately 340,000 native speakers in 2000. 
 The Toraja language is the native language Tana Toraja. It has a total of 750,000 speakers.
 Mandar, Mamuju and Pattae' are the languages spoken by the Mandar people in the province of West Sulawesi, especially in Mamuju, Polewali Mandar, Majene and Pasangkayu Regencies. In addition to the core in the tribal areas, they are also scattered in coastal parts of South Sulawesi. It is spoken by around 400,000 people.
 The Duri language is a language spoken in the north of Mount Bambapuang, Enrekang and into the border of Tana Toraja. There are an estimated around 130,000 native speakers. It is the prestige variety of the Massenrempulu languages. 
 The Konjo language is divided into two groups: the Coastal Konjo language and the Highland Konjo language. The Coastal Konjo live in coastal areas, notably the Bulukumba area, in the southeastern corner of the southern part of the island of Sulawesi. The Mountain Konjo live in the mountains of southeastern Sulawesi, around Bawakaraeng. It has a total of almost 300,000 native speakers.

In 2010 there were 3,921,543 males and 4,111,008 females with 1,848,132 housing units, with an average of 4.34 people per unit versus national average of 3.86. Some 13.3 percent of the population was under the national poverty line.

 The Human Development Index (HDI) for South Sulawesi in 2008 reached 70.22.
 Life expectancy was 69.60 in 2008.
 Poor population was at 12.31 percent in 2009, amounting to 963.6 thousand persons.
 There was an unemployment rate of 8.90 percent in 2009, amounting to 296,559 people.

Religion

The main religion in South Sulawesi is Islam at 89.62% (7,200,938). Other major religions include Protestantism 7.62% (612,751), Roman Catholicism 1.54% (124,255), Buddhism 0.24% (19,867), Hinduism 0.72% (58,393), and Confucianism 0.004% (367).

Economy

The Sulawesi economy grew 7.78 percent in 2008 and grew by 6.20 percent in 2009. Economic Growth in the First Quarter of 2010 reached 7.77 percent. The GDP in 2009 (ADHK) amounted to Rp 47.31 trillion and 99.90 Trillion (ADHB).

Natural resources

As one of the national rice granaries, South Sulawesi annually produces 2,305,469 tons of rice. Of that amount, rice designated for local consumption is around 884,375 tons and 1,421,094 tons of reserves remain for distribution to other eastern areas. Rice is even exported to Malaysia, to the Philippines, and to Papua New Guinea. The locations of the largest rice production are in the Bone regency, in Soppeng, in Wajo, in Sidrap, in Pinrang, and in Luwu (Bodowasipilu Area).

Food

In addition to corn, the South Sulawesi region also produces cassavas, sweet potatoes, green beans, peanuts, and soybeans.  Some luxuries such as hybrid coconuts, cocoa, coffee, pepper, vanilla, tea, cashews, and cotton are also produced. The Tata Guna Horan Agreement (TGHK) of 2004 protects a lot of the forest in South Sulawesi creating a limited output of timber related products.

Tuna and snapper-grouper are caught in large proportions and seaweed is grown to eat. Farms also have all of the typical animals such as chickens, cows, pigs, goats, etc.

Mining

One of the factors that contributes to the high GRDP of South Sulawesi is the mining sector. Nickel, gold, magnesium, iron, granite, lead, and stone products are mined.

Transportation

Trans-Sulawesi Railway is being constructed. It will connect Makassar and Parepare. 44 km of the railway, connecting Barru to Palanro is targeted to operate in the end of 2018. The entire Makassar-Parepare railway, with a length of 150 km, will be completed in 2019.

Airports in South Sulawesi include Sultan Hasanuddin International Airport (Makassar), Palopo Lagaligo Airport (Palopo), Pongtiku Airport (Tana Toraja), and Haji Aroepala Airport (Selayar), Andi Jemma Airport (Masamba), Soroako Airport (Soroako).

Ports include Soekarno-Hatta (Makassar), Tanjung Ringgit (Palopo), Nusantara, (Pare-Pare) and Pattumbukang (Selayar).

Culture

Philosophy
 Siri Na Pacce (ᨔᨗᨑᨗ ᨊ ᨄᨌᨙ) is one cultural philosophy of the  Bugis-Makassar Society which must be upheld. If one is a siri' na pacce (not a person), then that person doesn't exceed the behavior of animals, because it has no sense of shame, self-esteem, and social concerns. The people of Bugis-Makassar teach morality in the form of advice about decency, prohibition, and the rights and obligations that dominate human action to preserve and defend himself and his honor. They have a very strong relationship with the view of Islam in terms of spirituality, where the strength of the soul can conquer the body. The core concept of siri' na pacce covers all aspects of community life and is the identity of the Bugis-Makassar.
 Siri Nipakasiri (ᨔᨗᨑᨗ ᨊᨗᨄᨀᨔᨗᨑᨗ) occurs when someone insulted or treated someone outside the boundaries of reasonableness. Then he or his family had to enforce siri' (ᨔᨗᨑᨗ) to restore the honour that has been deprived of, if not it would be called "mate siri' (ᨆᨈᨙ ᨔᨗᨑᨗ)" or dead status and dignity as a human being. The Bugis-Makassar would rather die than live without siri'. 
 Siri Masiri (ᨔᨗᨑᨗ ᨆᨔᨗᨑᨗ) is a way of life that intends to maintain, improve, or achieve a feat performed by earnest and hard.

Traditional costume
Baju Bodo (ᨅᨍᨘ ᨅᨚᨉᨚ)[Mks] or Waju Tokko (ᨓᨍᨘ ᨈᨚᨀᨚ)[Bug] is the traditional costume of the women. Baju Bodo is rectangular and is usually short sleeved. According to customs, every color of the clothes worn by women shows the age or the dignity of the wearer. Clothing is often used for ceremonies such as weddings. But now, Baju Bodo is worn in other events such as dance competitions or to welcome guests.

Traditional dance

The traditional dance in South Sulawesi is a combination of dance elements in the form of movement, music, lighting and fashion used by dancers. The combination tells the message about the story of the habits of the community in the past. Like there is a dance that tells about the war, an expression of community excitement and welcoming guests.

In this case, the Bugis-Makassar tribe, whose numbers dominate in representing dance styles in South Sulawesi. However, the Toraja also have many traditional dances that are ritualistic. Some Mandar tribes also inhabit this province and have their own uniqueness in the arts. The rest are tribes of Duri, Pattinjo, Maiwa, Endekan, Pattae, and Ammatoa Kajang, who also paint the distinctive art of South Sulawesi.

Traditional ship

The pinisi or phinisi (ᨄᨗᨊᨗᨔᨗ) is a traditional Indonesian two-masted sailing ship. It was mainly built by the Konjo tribe, a sub-ethnic group but was, and still is used widely by the Buginese and Makassarese, mostly for inter-insular transportation, cargo, and fishing purposes within the Indonesian archipelago.

The hull of the ships looks similar to that of a dhow while the fore-and-aft rigging is similar to that of western schooners, although it might be more correctly termed to resemble a ketch, as the front mast is the larger.
The large mainsails differ from western style gaff rigs though, as they often do not have a boom and the sail is not lowered with the gaff. Instead it is reefed towards the mast, much like a curtain, thus allowing the gaff to be used as deck crane in the harbor. The lower part of the mast itself may resemble a tripod or is made of two poles. Pinisi may be 20 to 35 meters long and can weigh up to 350 tons. The masts may be as high as 30 meters above the deck.

Traditional houses
South Sulawesi has three types of traditional houses. The most known are the Rumah Panggung (Balla/Bola) from Bugis Makassar and the Tongkonan from Toraja.

 Rumah Panggung ( Balla ᨅᨒ[Mks] / Bola ᨅᨚᨒ[Bug] )  Some of the considerations for the building of the house are should it face the sunrise, overlook a plateau, or overlook a cardinal direction.

 Usually a good day or a month to build the house is determined by those who have the skill in that regard. Building the house is preceded by a ritual ceremony.

 Tongkonan is the traditional ancestral house, or rumah adat of the Torajan people. Tongkonan have a distinguishing boat-shaped and oversized saddleback roof. Like most of Indonesia's Austronesian-based traditional architecture, tongkonan are built on piles. The construction of a tongkonan is laborious work and it is usually built with the help of all of one's family members. In the original Toraja society, only nobles had the right to build tongkonan while commoners lived in smaller and less decorated homes called banua.

Traditional food

Rice and other crops such as bananas are abundant so almost all dishes are, like the Bugis Makassar cake, made from rice and bananas. Coastal areas of South Sulawesi eat Bolu (milkfish), Shrimp, Sunu (grouper), and Crab.

In South Sulawesi, the traditional food is diverse, ranging from soup to traditional cakes.

Traditional weapons

 Badik (ᨅᨉᨗ)[Mks] or Kawali (ᨀᨓᨒᨗ)[Bug] A badik is a knife with a specific form developed by the Bugis and Makassar. The Badik is sharp, single or double sided, and has a length of about half a meter. Like with a kris, the blade shape is asymmetric and often decorated with prestige. However, different from the kris, the badik never had a ganja (buffer strip). Some versions from Sulawesi are decorated with inlaid gold figure on the blade called jeko. The handle is made of wood, horn or ivory in a shape of a pistol grip at a 45° to 90° angle and is often decorated with carvings. From Sulawesi, the badik soon spread to neighbouring islands like Java, Borneo, Sumatra, and as far as the Malay Peninsula, creating a wide variety of badik according to each region and ethic group.

As with other blades in the Malay Archipelago, traditionally-made badik are believed to be imbued with a supernatural force during the time of their forging. The pamor in particular is said to affect its owner, bringing either well-being and prosperity or misfortune and poverty. Aside from being used as a weapon and hunting tool, the badik is a symbol of cultural identity in Sulawesi. The Bugis and Makassar people still carry badik as part of their daily attire. The badik is worn on the right side, with the butt end of the handle pointing to the rear.

See also

Ma'jonga
Polewali-Mamasa

References

Notes

Bibliography 
 
 
 
 
 
 

 
Provinces of Indonesia
States and territories established in 1960